Heather Watson was the defending champion, but she lost in the first round to Monica Puig. 
Samantha Stosur won the title for the second time, defeating Eugenie Bouchard in the final, 3–6, 7–5, 6–2.

Seeds

Draw

Finals

Top half

Bottom half

Qualifying

Seeds

Qualifiers

Lucky losers
  Vania King

Draw

First qualifier

Second qualifier

Third qualifier

Fourth qualifier

References
Main Draw
Qualifying Draw

Hp Open - Singles
2013 HP Open